The Nikon FM is a mechanically operated, interchangeable lens, 35 mm film, single-lens reflex (SLR) camera. It was manufactured in Japan between 1977 and 1982 by Nippon Kogaku K. K. (now Nikon Corporation).

History
The FM was the replacement for Nikkormat FT3, which had been introduced only a few months prior. It introduced an entirely new compact, but rugged, copper-aluminum alloy (duralumin) chassis that would become the basis for Nikon's highly successful range of compact semi-professional SLR cameras.

These cameras were intended to provide a more reasonably priced alternative to Nikon's professional F-series cameras, which at the time was the Nikon F2. They were all-new successors to the Nikkormat F- and EL-series of amateur-level SLRs, but despite the lower price-point they continued Nikon's reputation for high-quality construction, impressive durability and measured technical innovation.

The FM has proven to be a remarkably long-lived and reliable camera. Nippon Kogaku would over the next twenty-nine years use the same chassis (but with some modifications) and basic design philosophy for the FE (introduced in 1978), FM2 (1982), FE2 (1983), FA (1983) and the limited production FM3A of 2001.

Design and construction

The FM is constructed almost entirely from metal and uses a mechanical shutter. It is manual-focus-only, with manual exposure control. Being mechanical, the FM needs no batteries to operate (though two 1.5 volt 357 or 76A or LR44 or SR44 cells are required to operate the light meter). The metering system comprises a gallium  photodiode (with 60/40% center-weighting) that meters through-the-lens at maximum aperture. Its reading is displayed by a "center-the-LED" system using vertically arranged light-emitting diodes (LEDs) next to +/O/- markers on the right side of the viewfinder that indicate overexposure, correct, or underexposure, respectively. The photographer adjusts the aperture or shutter-speed until the "O" LED illuminated to indicate correct exposure. This system can be traced back to the Nikkormat FT of 1965 and its "center-the-needle" system. The succeeding Nikon FM2 uses an improved center-the-LED system.

For its time, the FM used a modern titanium-bladed, vertical-travel focal plane shutter capable of speeds from 1 second to 1/1000 of a second, plus bulb. Flash X-sync was at speeds up to 1/125th second.

The body has dimensions of 89.5 mm height, 142 mm width, 60.5 mm depth and 590 g weight. It was available in two finishes; silver with black trim and all black.

Lens compatibility
The FM accepts all Nikon F bayonet mount lenses, with certain limitations or exceptions. Full compatibility requires lenses that support the Automatic Maximum-Aperture Indexing (AI) specification. This includes most Nikon lenses manufactured after 1977. Pre-AI lenses can be used, but only with stop-down metering.

Many newer Nikon and third-party F-mount lenses are also compatible. The only major exceptions are G-type Nikkor lenses, which have no aperture ring and thus no way of properly controlling exposure, and DX Nikkors, which do not resolve an image large enough to cover the 135 frame. All other AF Nikkor lenses will mount and be usable, but autofocus and Vibration Reduction (VR) will not be supported.

Both IX Nikkor lenses, for Nikon's Advanced Photo System (APS) SLRs, and very old "invasive" Fisheye-Nikkor lenses from the 1960s must not be mounted on the FM, as their rear elements will damage the FM's reflex mirror.

Other features

The FM has a "full information" viewfinder. In addition to the metering LEDs; the viewfinder also displays the set shutter speed and lens aperture to give context to the LEDs. A fixed K-type focus screen with 3 mm split-image rangefinder and 1 mm microprism collar is fitted.

Major system accessories for the FM include the MD-11 and MD-12 motor drives; which enables continuous film advance at 3.5 frames per second, the Data Back MF-12; enabling the imprinting of date and time data on the film, and the Speedlight SB-8E electronic flash; guide number 82/25 (feet/meters) at ASA 100.

Note that there were two distinct versions of the FM, depending on how the FM's light meter (see below) was activated when a motor drive was mounted. The original FM had a rotary switch shutter button collar to lock the shutter, or switch to motor drive mode when the MD-11 was mounted. The MD-12 activated the meter automatically and the switch was omitted on late (1979 or after) FMs. Nippon Kogaku also took the opportunity to construct late FMs more strongly internally than early FMs.

Design history

Beginning in 1977 with the FM, there was a complete overhaul of Nippon Kogaku's entire Nikon SLR line. The 1970s and 1980s were an era of intense competition between the major SLR brands: Nikon, Canon, Minolta, Pentax and Olympus. Between circa 1975 to 1985, there was a dramatic shift away from heavy all-metal manual mechanical camera bodies to much more compact bodies with microprocessor electronic automation. In addition, because of rapid advances in electronics, the brands continually leap frogged each other with models having new or more automatic features. The industry was trying to expand out from the saturated high-end professional and advanced amateur market and appeal to the large mass of low-end amateur photographers itching to move up from compact automatic leaf shutter rangefinder (RF) cameras to the more versatile and glamorous SLR but were intimidated by the advanced learning curve required to operate a traditional SLR.

Both Nikon's F2 and the Nikkormats were prized for their toughness and reliability. Nippon Kogaku wanted to distill these qualities into a new smaller and lighter design.  Nippon Kogaku continued with their unusually high standard of workmanship for amateur-level SLRs. For the FM this meant the use of high-strength machined metal parts, hardened metal gears, a bearing-mounted film and shutter transport, and a camera assembled to precise tolerances. As a result, the Nikon FM is one of the most reliable 35mm SLR designs ever built.

The Nikon FM sold very well compared to the competing mechanical Pentax MX (released 1977) and Olympus OM-1N (1979) cameras. It was also a very popular backup camera among professional photographers using the Nikon F2 and F3. Because of its durability and access to the Nikkor lens line, the FM came to dominate its market niche and was rewarded by the introduction of an improved successor, the Nikon FM2, in 1982. Time has proven the FM to be tough and reliable and it is now regarded as one of the finest SLRs of its generation.

See also
 System camera
 Nikon F
 Nikon FM10
 Nikon Df

References

 "Nikon MF/AF Bodies - Lens Compatibility" http://www.nikonlinks.com/unklbil/bodylens.htm retrieved 3 January 2006
 Anonymous.  "Nikon EM: Budget Priced 35mm Reflex" pp 62–66.  Modern Photography's Photo Buying Guide '85.  reprint from Modern Photography, July 1979.
 Comen, Paul.  Magic Lantern Guides: Nikon Classic Cameras; F, FE, FE2, FA and Nikkormat F series.  First Edition.  Magic Lantern Guides. Rochester, NY: Silver Pixel Press, 1996.  
 Hansen, William P. Hansen's Complete Illustrated Guide to Cameras; Volume 2. Kennesaw, GA: Rochdale Publishing Company, 2003. 
 Matanle, Ivor. Collecting and Using Classic SLRs. First Paperback Edition. New York, NY: Thames and Hudson, 1997. 
 Peterson, B. Moose.  Magic Lantern Guides: Nikon Classic Cameras, Volume II; F2, FM, EM, FG, N2000 (F-301), N2020 (F-501), EL series.  First Edition.  Magic Lantern Guides. Rochester, NY: Silver Pixel Press, 1996.  
 Schneider, Jason.  "How The Japanese Camera Took Over" pp 56–57, 78, 86.  Modern Photography, Volume 48, Number 7; July 1984.
 Schneider, Jason.  "A Half Century of The World's Greatest Cameras!" pp 56–59, 76, 124.  Modern Photography, Volume 51, Number 9; September 1987.
 Schneider, Jason.  "Great Buys In Used SLRs!!" pp 80–81, 130.  Popular Photography, Volume 61, Number 11; November 1997.
 Shell, Bob translator and Harold Franke. Magic Lantern Guides: Canon Classic Cameras; A-1, AT-1, AE-1, AE-1 Program, T50, T70, T90. Sixth Printing 2001. Magic Lantern Guides. Rochester, NY: Silver Pixel Press, 1995. 
 Stafford, Simon and Rudi Hillebrand & Hans-Joachim Hauschild.  The New Nikon Compendium: Cameras, Lenses & Accessories since 1917.  2004 Updated North American Edition. Asheville, NC: Lark Books, 2003.

External links

 Nikon FM articles from mir.com.my Photography in Malaysia
 Nikon FM photo from Nikon Corporation's online archives
 best manual focus Nikon SLRs page from www.cameraquest.com/classics Stephen Gandy's CameraQuest Classic Camera Profiles

FM
FM
Cameras introduced in 1977